German Nikolayevich Apukhtin (born 12 June 1936 - 2003
) was a Soviet Russian footballer.

Honours
 Soviet Top League bronze: 1958, 1964.
 1960 European Nations' Cup winner: 1960.
 Top 33 players year-end list: 1956, 1957, 1959, 1960.

International career
Apukhtin made his debut for USSR on 1 June 1957 in a friendly against Romania. He played in the 1958 FIFA World Cup. He was selected for the squad for the first ever European Nations' Cup in 1960, where the Soviets were champions, but did not play in any games at the tournament.

References

External links
Profile (in Russian)

1936 births
2003 deaths
Russian footballers
Soviet footballers
Soviet Union international footballers
1958 FIFA World Cup players
1960 European Nations' Cup players
UEFA European Championship-winning players
FC Lokomotiv Moscow players
PFC CSKA Moscow players
FC Metallurg Lipetsk players
SC Odesa players
Soviet Top League players
Footballers from Moscow
Association football forwards